Marcia Lynne Langton  (born 1951) is an Australian academic.  she is the Redmond Barry Distinguished Professor at the Melbourne School of Population and Global Health, University of Melbourne. Regarded as one of Australia's top intellectuals, Langton is also known for her activism in the Indigenous rights arena.

Early life and education
Marcia Langton was born in 1951 to Kathleen (née Waddy) and grew up in south-central Queensland and Brisbane as a descendant of the Yiman and Bidjara heritage, both groups being Aboriginal Australian peoples. Her father had no presence in her life. Her mother married Scots-born, ex-Korean War veteran Douglas Langton when Marcia was a year old.

She and her mother moved often, without secure housing or employment, and she attended nine primary schools.

She enrolled at the University of Queensland, becoming an activist for Indigenous rights.

While in Japan, Langton learnt about Buddhism, and later became a self-described "lazy Buddhist". Wiradjuri artist Brook Andrew painted Langton in a Buddhist pose.

On her return to Australia, Langton studied anthropology at the Australian National University in the 1980s, becoming the first Indigenous honours graduate in anthropology.

Early career
Langton worked with several organisations dealing with Indigenous social and cultural issues and land claims. These included the Australian Film Commission; the Central Land Council in Northern Territory (where she was a land claims anthropologist);  the Northern Territory Aboriginal Issues Unit; the Queensland Government and, in the early 1990s, the Cape York Land Council.

Academic career
In 1995 Langton moved full-time into university research and teaching. She spent five years as Ranger Professor of Aboriginal and Torres Strait Islander Studies at Northern Territory University (now Charles Darwin University) in Darwin before moving to Melbourne.

Her 2005 PhD thesis in geography at Macquarie University applies phenomenological theory to the study of Aboriginal peoples of the eastern Cape York Peninsula.

In 2012 she became the patron of the Indigenous Reading Project, a charitable organisation that uses digital technology to improve the reading ability of Aboriginal and Torres Strait Islander children.

Langton is known for her work in several academic fields, linked by a concern for Indigenous rights, justice, and artistic expression. Langton conducts anthropological work to support land claims by Aboriginal peoples and their negotiations with mining companies and the state.

Activism
In 1976 Langton, Bobbi Sykes, Sue Chilly (also spelt Chilli), and Naomi Mayers formed the Black Women's Action (BWA) group, which later evolved into the Roberta Sykes Foundation. BWA  published a monthly community newspaper for Aboriginal people, Koori Bina (meaning "Black ears"), which ran until June 1979. Langton later wrote that the founders of the paper had been inspired by Abo Call, which had been published in 1938 in Sydney by Jack Patten (co-founder of the Aborigines Progressive Association) and Percy Reginald Stephensen. She was also involved in a number of other Black community publications, and wrote in the introduction to her 1979 Listing of Aboriginal periodicals: "the experience of producing those newspapers within a hostile white environment... because it has the power and resources, has historically defined us". 

In December 1976, Langton played the part of Vena, a nurse, in Here Comes the Nigger by Gerry Bostock, which played at Black Theatre in Redfern, Sydney.  

In 2000 she was one of five Indigenous leaders who were granted an audience with the Queen to discuss an apology and Indigenous recognition in the Australian Constitution.

In May 2008, the federal government appointed her to the Native Title Payments Working Group looking into reform of the Australian native title process.

She has argued that settlement with mining companies on Aboriginal land often benefits local interests more than the Australian government, and that the proposed 2010 resource tax on mining in Australia needed a redesign to support Indigenous rights and employment.

In 2017 she campaigned against environmentalists, arguing that they were thwarting native title reform as part of their case against the Adani Carmichael coal mine. Her criticisms of Indigenous litigants have been rebuffed by Indigenous lawyer Tony McAvoy SC.

She is a frequent media commentator, and has served on various high-level committees on Indigenous issues. These have included the Council for Aboriginal Reconciliation, the directorship of the Centre for Indigenous Natural and Cultural Resource Management, chair of the Indigenous Higher Education Advisory Council, and as chair of the Cape York Institute for Policy and Leadership.

Other activities and roles
As a member of the Northern Territory Aboriginal Issues Unit, Langton worked for the 1989 Royal Commission into Aboriginal Deaths in Custody.

In 2012 she gave the Boyer Lectures titled The Quiet Revolution: Indigenous People and the Resources Boom.

She has been on the judging panel for the annual Horne Prize since its inception in 2016.

On 30 October 2019, Langton was announced as a co-chair on the Senior Advisory Group of the Indigenous voice to government, convened by Ken Wyatt, along with by Professor Tom Calma . The group consists of 20 leaders and experts from across the country.

Recognition and honours 
Langton was made a member of the Order of Australia in the 1993 Queen's Birthday Honours for "service as an anthropologist and advocate of Aboriginal issues". She was promoted to officer of the Order of Australia in the 2020 Australia Day Honours for "distinguished service to tertiary education, and as an advocate for Aboriginal and Torres Strait Islander people".

Other recognition has included:
 2001: Fellow, Academy of Social Sciences in Australia
 2001: Inducted onto the Victorian Honour Roll of Women
 2002: Neville Bonner Award for Indigenous Teacher of the Year (jointly with Larissa Behrendt)
 2005: Named one Australia's top 20 intellectuals in a survey conducted by The Sydney Morning Herald
 2008: Listed as 7th in a list of Australia's top 40 public intellectuals by the API Network
 2012: Fellow of Trinity College (University of Melbourne)
 2016: Fellow of Emmanuel College at The University of Queensland
 2016: University of Melbourne Redmond Barry Distinguished Professor, a continuing role
2017: First Associate Provost at the University of Melbourne
 2021: Honorary Fellow of the Australian Academy of Technology and Engineering

In 2020, the International Astronomical Union's Working Group for Small Body Nomenclature (CSBN) formally approved the asteroid 1979 ML as 7809 Marcialangton in honour of her efforts to incorporate Aboriginal astronomical perspectives into the Australian National Curriculum.

Selected works

Books
Langton, M. 2018. Welcome to Country: A Travel Guide to Indigenous Australia. Hardie Grant Travel.
Davis, M. and Langton M. (eds.). 2016. It's Our Country: Indigenous Arguments for Meaningful Constitutional Recognition and Reform. Melbourne University Press.
Langton M. 2013. The Quiet Revolution: Indigenous People and the Resources Boom. ABC Books.
Langton M. and J. Longbottom (eds.) 2012. Community futures, legal architecture: foundations for Indigenous peoples in the global mining boom. London: Routledge.
 Perkins, R. and Langton M. (eds). 2008. First Australians. An Illustrated History. Melbourne University Publishing, Melbourne.
Langton, M., Palmer, L., Mazel, O., K. Shain & M.Tehan (eds). 2006. Settling with Indigenous Peoples: Modern Treaty and Agreement Making. Annandale, NSW: Federation Press.
Langton, M. & M. Nakata (eds). 2005. Australian Indigenous Knowledge and Libraries. Canberra: Australian Academic and Research Libraries.
Langton, M., 2005. An Aboriginal ontology of being and place: the performance of Aboriginal property relations in the Princess Charlotte Bay area of eastern Cape York Peninsula, Australia. Unpub. PhD thesis, Human Geography/Anthropology. Sydney: Macquarie University.
Langton, M., M. Tehan, L. R. Palmer & K. Shain (eds). 2004. Honour among nations? Treaties and agreements with Indigenous peoples. Melbourne: Melbourne University Publishing. (Choice List of Outstanding Academic Titles 2006, American Libraries Association, Choice: Current Reviews for Academic Libraries)
 
Langton M. & W. Jonas., 1994. The Little Red, Yellow and Black (and Green and Blue and White) Book: a short guide to Indigenous Australia. Canberra: AIATSIS.
Langton, M., 1994. Valuing cultures: recognising Indigenous cultures as a valued part of Australian heritage. Council for Aboriginal Reconciliation. Canberra : Australian Govt. Pub. Service.
Langton, M., 1993. Well, I heard it on the radio and I saw it on the television: an essay for the Australian Film Commission on the politics and aesthetics of filmmaking by and about Aboriginal people and things. Sydney: Australian Film Commission.
Langton, M. & N. Peterson, (eds). 1983. Aborigines, Land & Land Rights. Valuing Cultures: recognising Indigenous cultures as a valued part of Australian heritage. Canberra: AGPS.
Langton, M., 1983. After the tent embassy: images of Aboriginal history in black and white photographs Sydney: Valadon Publishing.

Articles
 Langton, M., 2010. The Resource Curse. Griffith Review, no. 29.
 Langton, M., and O. Mazel. 2008. Poverty in the midst of plenty: Aboriginal people, the 'resource curse' and Australia's mining boom. Journal of Energy and Natural Resources Law. 26(1): 31–65.
 Langton, M., 2008. chapter in Manne, R. (ed.) "Dear Mr Rudd: Ideas for a Better Australia". Black Inc.
Langton, M., 2007. Trapped in the Aboriginal reality show. Griffith Review Edition 19 – Re-imagining Australia. Sydney: Griffith University.
 Langton, M., 2003. chapter "Grounded and Gendered: Aboriginal Women in Australian Cinema" in French, L. (ed.) Womenvision: Women and the Moving Image in Australia. Damned Publishing, Melbourne. pp. 43–56.

Films
 Jardiwarnpa: a Warlpiri fire (with Ned Lander and Rachel Perkins)
Night Cries: a rural tragedy (with Tracey Moffatt and Penny McDonald)
Blood Brothers, a 1993 four-part Australian documentary series
Rachel Perkins First Australians series for SBS television, 2008, features many commentaries by Langton
Here I Am, 2011

Footnotes

References

External links 

  About Noel Pearson and Langton.

1951 births
Living people
Australian indigenous rights activists
Women human rights activists
Australian anthropologists
Australian women anthropologists
Australian geographers
Women geographers
University of Queensland alumni
Australian National University alumni
Macquarie University alumni
Bidjara (Warrego River)
Officers of the Order of Australia
Academic staff of the University of Melbourne
University of Melbourne women
Fellows of the Academy of the Social Sciences in Australia
Indigenous Australian academics
Indigenous Australian women academics
Australian Buddhists